Musaabad (also Romanized as Mūsáābād) is a village in Jolgeh Rural District, in the Central District of Asadabad County, Hamadan Province, Iran. At the 2006 census, its population was 1,716, in 415 families.

References 

Populated places in Asadabad County